Berberis hayatana is a species of flowering plant in the family Berberidaceae, first described in 1952, then renamed in 1954. It is endemic to Taiwan.

Berberis hayatana is a low evergreen shrub. Leaves are leathery, simple, narrowly oblanceolate to elliptical. Inflorescence is a fascicle of 2-6 flowers. Berries are ellipsoid, black.

References

hayatana
Endemic flora of Taiwan
Plants described in 1952